Tangtouxia railway station is located in Tangxia, Dongguan, Guangdong province, People's Republic of China. It is a station on the Guangshen railway.

With the acceleration of Guangshen Railway, Tangtouxia railway station has been suspended in 2006.

Buildings and structures in Dongguan
Railway stations in Guangdong
Stations on the Beijing–Kowloon Railway
Stations on the Guangzhou–Shenzhen Railway